Alejandro Mendoza Corujo (born 17 May 1986), also known as Moreno, is a Spanish professional footballer who plays for CD Mensajero as a defender.

External links
 
 

1986 births
Living people
People from Tenerife
Sportspeople from the Province of Santa Cruz de Tenerife
Spanish footballers
Footballers from the Canary Islands
Association football defenders
Segunda División players
Segunda División B players
Tercera División players
CD Tenerife B players
CD Tenerife players
UB Conquense footballers
CD Mensajero players
Maltese Premier League players
Birkirkara F.C. players
Qormi F.C. players
Spanish expatriate footballers
Expatriate footballers in Malta